The SAFA Loca Football Association is the fifth tier of domestic football in the South African football pyramid.

The competition is split into four phases. The first phase is a nominal league competition between clubs within a Local Football Association's (LFA) jurisdiction. The second phase is a tournament between winners of the LFA leagues to establish a regional winner. The third phase establishes Provincial Winners via a playoff competition between Regional Winners. The fourth phase sees the Provincial Winners compete in the National Play-offs for access to the SAFA Regional League.

5